Andrea Fulignati (born 31 October 1994) is an Italian footballer who plays as a goalkeeper for Catanzaro.

Career
Born in Empoli, and a youth product of small Tuscan team Sestese, he was scouted by Palermo and signed for the Under-19 youth team in 2012. He successively became third-choice keeper for the first time in the following years.

In 2015 he was loaned out to Serie B club Trapani to get more first-team experience, but ended up playing only three games during the season, as Nícolas became the first choice.

He successively returned to Palermo in 2016 to be the reserve of Josip Posavec for the Serie A club. He made his debut in the Italian top flight on 12 March 2017 in a home match against Roma, lost with the result of 0–3. He successively managed to break into the starting lineup for the last remaining league games, eventually overtaking Posavec as first choice and playing a total eight games throughout the entire season.

On 27 July 2018, Fulignati joined to Serie A team Empoli a 3-years contract.

After only 6-month Fulignati joined to Ascoli until 30 June 2021.

On 31 January 2019, Fulignati joined to SPAL on loan until 30 June 2019.

On 2 September 2019, he joined Perugia on loan until 30 June 2021, with Nicola Leali moved to opposite direction. On 23 February 2021, he signed a new contract with Perugia until 30 June 2024.

On 28 June 2022, Fulignati signed a two-year contract with Catanzaro.

References

External links
 Palermocalcio.it 
 

1994 births
People from Empoli
Footballers from Tuscany
Living people
Italian footballers
Italy youth international footballers
Association football goalkeepers
Palermo F.C. players
Trapani Calcio players
A.C. Cesena players
Empoli F.C. players
Ascoli Calcio 1898 F.C. players
S.P.A.L. players
A.C. Perugia Calcio players
U.S. Catanzaro 1929 players
Serie A players
Serie B players
Serie D players
Sportspeople from the Metropolitan City of Florence